Dapšioniai is a village in the Radviliškis district in Lithuania, 3 kilometers northwest of Beinorava. The village is home to the Dievo Apvaizdos Bažnyčia, a Neoclassical church, as well as the Dapšionių ąžuolas - an oak tree 23 meters in height. The tree is under protection as an object of natural heritage of the state.

2 kilometers east of Beinorava is the Dapšioniai railway station, covering the Radviliškis-Daugpilis railway, although it is out of service.

Population

Notable people
Domas Cesevičius, a Lithuanian economist, journalist, and publicist was born in Dapšioniai on 12 November 1902.

References 

Villages in Šiauliai County